Events in the year 1652 in India.

Events
Building of the Red Fort at Delhi.

References

 
India
Years of the 17th century in India